Church of the Goths may refer to:
 Gothic Christianity, the distinct Arian church of the early Goths
 Metropolitanate of Gothia, the church of the Crimean Goths
 Archdiocese of the Goths and the Northlands, a modern Swedish church claiming the Crimean Gothic heritage